Captain, later Admiral, Abraham de Bellebat (Belébat?) de Duquesne-Guitton, also spelled Duquesne-Guiton (1648-d. 1724), was a French naval commander.

In 1687 he sailed from the Cape of Good Hope in L'Oiseau, with a French Ambassador, Claude Céberet du Boullay, on board, to establish a French Embassy in the Kingdom of Siam.

He sighted Eendracht Land on the Western Australian coast and sailed in close to shore near the Swan River on 4 August - this was France's first recorded contact with Australia.  He wrote that it looked very attractive, and fully covered with green despite "the fact that we were in the middle of winter in this country".

His nephew Nicolas Gedeon de Voutron also sighted the western coast of Australia that year on another ship at the same latitude.

He was appointed Governor General of the Windward Islands ("Gouverneur général des Isles du Vent") in reward for renouncing Protestantism and becoming a Catholic, and held that office from 1714 to 1717.

Notes

History of the French Navy
French explorers
French Navy admirals
European exploration of Australia
1648 births
1724 deaths
Governors general of the French Antilles